Mosayile Kuthira Meenukal (Horse Fish of Mosa) is a 2014 Indian Malayalam-language adventure film directed by Ajith Pillai. Produced by Niyas Ismail under the banner of Frames Inevitable, it stars Asif Ali and Sunny Wayne along with Swathi Reddy and Janani Iyer as the female leads while pivotal supporting roles are played by Joju George, Nedumudi Venu, Nishanth Sagar and Yassar. Cinematography was by Abinandhan Ramanujam and music was composed by Prashant Pillai. Major parts of the film were shot in the islands of Lakshadweep and Andaman besides the different locations in Kerala.

The movie was released on 1 May 2014 and tells the story of a hedonistic Christian who is taken out of prison to a picturesque seaside town where he learns to amend his selfish ways. The movie was praised for its excellent cinematography and different style of direction and story telling .

Plot
The film starts with Alex narrating his sad story. He is the scion of a large and rich Christian family, whose male members take pride in flaunting their virility. Due to his wayward life he lands up in prison. He makes attempts to flee from prison but in vain. A saviour appears before him in the form of Akbar Ali. Akbar Ali is from Lakshadweep, and circumstances make Alex follow him to the beautiful islands. The aftermath is the rest of the narration.

Cast
 Asif Ali as Alex, 14th son of a rich farmer.
 Sunny Wayne as Akbar Ali, a fisherman.
 Nedumudi Venu as Kuriachen, Alex's father.
 Janani Iyer as Deena, a postal worker
 Swathi Reddy as Isa
 Nishanth Sagar as Hashim
 P. Balachandran as Raviettan
 Jijoy Rajagopal as Sulaiman
 Joju George as Mathew P. Mathew, Alex's nephew.
 Chemban Vinod Jose as Nadayadi Suni
 Mridul Nair as Saddam Hussain
 Master Reinhard Abernathy as young Alex

Dubbing Artist
Praveen Harisree
Sunil Panicker
Siby Kuruvila
Riya Saira
Sukanya Shaji

Music
The music of the film is composed by Prashant Pillai. The music album has 4 songs:

References

External links 
 
 

2010s Malayalam-language films
2014 films
Indian comedy thriller films
2010s comedy thriller films